Sidekicks is a 1974 American made-for-television comedy Western film directed by Burt Kennedy and starring Larry Hagman and Louis Gossett Jr. The film was a pilot for a proposed television show as a continuation of the 1971 theatrical release Skin Game, with James Garner and Gossett.

Plot
Quince and Jason (played by Larry Hagman and Louis Gossett Jr.), two grifters on the make in the Old West, are arrested by Prudy Jenkins (Blythe Danner), the zealous, rifle-wielding daughter of a small-town sheriff (Harry Morgan). The charge: They look like typical criminals. But as soon as she delivers her quarry to the sheriff, he orders her to release them. Later, though, the sheriff witnesses the two in a gunfight outside a saloon. This time, the sheriff locks them up. Then the lawman makes his first blunder. He leaves Prudy in charge of the prisoners while he goes on an errand. Sure enough, two outlaws, Sam and Ed (Gene Evans and Dick Peabody), break into the jail, tie up Prudy, and abscond with Quince and Jason, mistaking them for two suspected bank robbers.

The quartet ride out of town where they meet Sam and Ed's boss (Jack Elam). As one would never suspect, his name is Boss, and he does what most bosses do. He has a temper tantrum. He then lays into Sam and Ed for breaking the wrong criminals out of jail. Later, Prudy stumbles upon the gang's encampment. Boss has another tantrum. This time, he is so mad he decides to rob the town's bank. But the gang arrives a split second late as they witness the "right" criminals carrying out the job. Naturally Boss has another tantrum. He then organizes his gang to catch up with the bandits and their loot—which they do. Then the sheriff and his posse wander onto the scene. In the confusion that results, the criminals are all arrested, Quince and Jason are kicked out of the county, and Prudy is saved from a fate worse than sanity.

Cast
 Larry Hagman as Quince Drew
 Louis Gossett Jr. as Jason O'Rourke
 Blythe Danner as Prudy Jenkins
 Jack Elam as Boss
 Harry Morgan as Sheriff Jenkins
 Hal Williams as Max
 Gene Evans as Sam
 Noah Beery Jr. as Tom
 Dick Peabody as Ed
 Denver Pyle as Drunk
 John Beck as Luke
 Dick Haynes as Man
 Bill Shannon as Carl (as Billy Shannon)
 Tyler McVey as Jones

References

External links

1974 television films
1974 films
1970s Western (genre) comedy films
American Western (genre) comedy films
Films directed by Burt Kennedy
Films scored by David Shire
CBS network films
Television films as pilots
Television pilots not picked up as a series
1970s English-language films
1970s American films